In mathematics, specifically additive number theory, Romanov's theorem is a mathematical theorem proved by Nikolai Pavlovich Romanov. It states that given a fixed base , the set of numbers that are the sum of a prime and a positive integer power of  has a positive lower asymptotic density.

Statement 
Romanov initially stated that he had proven the statements "In jedem Intervall (0, x) liegen mehr als ax Zahlen, welche als Summe von einer Primzahl und einer k-ten Potenz einer ganzen Zahl darstellbar sind, wo a eine gewisse positive, nur von k abhängige Konstante bedeutet" and "In jedem Intervall (0, x) liegen mehr als bx Zahlen, weiche als Summe von einer Primzahl und einer Potenz von a darstellbar sind. Hier ist a eine gegebene ganze Zahl und b eine positive Konstante, welche nur von a abhängt". The second statement is generally accepted as the Romanov's theorem, for example in Nathanson's book.

Precisely, let  and let , . Then Romanov's theorem asserts that .

History 
Alphonse de Polignac wrote in 1849 that every odd number larger than 3 can be written as the sum of an odd prime and a power of 2. (He soon noticed a counterexample, namely 959.) The counterexample of 959 was, in fact, also mentioned in Euler's letter to Christian Goldbach, but they were working in the opposite direction, trying to find odd numbers that cannot be expressed in the form.

In 1934, Romanov proved the theorem. The positive constant  mentioned in the case  was later known as Romanov's constant. The history of such refinements are listed below. In particular, since  is shown to be less than 0.5 this implies that the odd numbers that cannot be expressed this way has positive lower asymptotic density.

Generalisations 
Analogous results of Romanov's theorem has been proven in number fields by Riegel in 1961. In 2015, the theorem was also proven for polynomials in finite fields.

References 

Theorems in number theory
Additive number theory